"Black and White Town" is the lead single from English rock band Doves' third album, Some Cities (2005). The single was released on 7 February 2005 and gave the band their second top-10 hit, charting at  6 on the UK Singles Chart. The atmospheric single is noted for its heavy piano and guitars played in unison, with Andy Williams' percussion maintaining a driving beat. The music video for "Black and White Town", directed by Lynne Ramsay, was filmed on the Summerston council estate and Prospecthill Circus estate in Toryglen Glasgow. There also exists a "director's cut" of the video, featuring different footage, which can be found on the DVD in the limited edition box set version of the Some Cities album.

The song was used prominently by the BBC during their coverage of the 2005 Six Nations rugby tournament. Not only was it used in the 2005 Six Nations championships, but it is still used in the BBC's coverage of all international rugby. It is also used for Sky's coverage of the UEFA Champions League, as well as being used in the video game FIFA 06 and BBC's Top Gear.

Track listings

Charts

Weekly charts

Year-end charts

Certifications

References

2004 songs
2005 singles
Doves (band) songs
Song recordings produced by Ben Hillier
Songs written by Andy Williams (Doves)
Songs written by Jez Williams
Songs written by Jimi Goodwin